Tun Syed Sheh bin Syed Abdullah Shahabudin (28 February 1912 – 31 January 1969) was the Yang di-Pertua Negeri of Penang, Malaysia from 1967 to 1969.

Honours

Honour of Penang
 As 2nd Yang di-Pertua Negeri of Penang ( - )
  Grand Master of the Order of the Defender of State

Honours of Malaysia
  : 
 Commander of the Order of the Defender of the Realm (P.M.N.) -Tan Sri (1962)
  : 
 Grand Commander of the Order of the Defender of the Realm (S.M.N.) -Tun (1968)

References
Tun Syed Sheh Bin Syed Abdullah Shahabuddin myKedah.com, accessed 5 June 2010.

Malaysian people of Arab descent
Yang di-Pertua Negeri of Penang
People from Kedah
Malaysian Muslims
Malaysian people of Malay descent
United Malays National Organisation politicians
Grand Commanders of the Order of the Defender of the Realm
Commanders of the Order of the Defender of the Realm
Ambassadors of Malaysia to Japan
High Commissioners of Malaysia to the United Kingdom
Ambassadors of Malaysia to Thailand
1912 births
1969 deaths